John R. MacDonald  was a Michigan politician.  He was a member of Knights of the Loyal Guard, Freemasons, Shriners and Knights of Pythias.

Early life
On March 30, 1857, MacDonald was born in Moretown, Washington County, Vermont.  In 1895, he was the first captain-general of Division No. 1 of The Knights of the Loyal Guard, a fraternal beneficiary society.  In 1905 and 1906, he served as Worshipful Master of Genesee Lodge No. 174 of the Free and Accepted Masons of Michigan.

Political life
He was elected as the Mayor of City of Flint in 1914 for a single 1-year term defeating his predecessor, Charles Stewart Mott.

Post-political life
MacDonald died at Hurley Hospital from injuries from a fall at home in January 1946. He was cremated with his ashes interred at Avondale Cemetery, Flint, Michigan.

References

1857 births
1946 deaths
American people of Scottish descent
American Freemasons
Mayors of Flint, Michigan
Michigan Progressives (1912)
20th-century American politicians